Eliminator is a 3D shoot 'em up for home computers published in 1988 by Hewson Consultants.

Reception
Info gave the game 4 stars.

References

External links 
Eliminator at Atari Mania
Eliminator at Lemon Amiga

1988 video games
Amiga games
Atari ST games
Shoot 'em ups
Video games developed in the United Kingdom
Hewson Consultants games